Typhochlaena paschoali is a species of tarantula (family Theraphosidae), in the subfamily Aviculariinae. It is native to Brazil.

Taxonomy 
The species was first described in 2012 by Rogério Bertani. The specific name honours Elbano Paschoal de Figueiredo Moraes, a Brazilian environmentalist who died early in April 2011. He was one of the founders of the non-governmental organization Grupo Ambientalista da Bahia (GAMBÁ), and was well known for his efforts in preserving the remnants of the Brazilian Atlantic forest in the state of Bahia, Brazil.

Description 
Typhochlaena paschoali is characterized mainly by its short, wide, straight, and multi-lobular spermathecae. It also has a brown cephalothorax and black abdomen with the dorsum (dorsal part of the abdomen) white with a zig-zag border. It is only known from the female.

References 

Theraphosidae
Spiders described in 2012
Spiders of Brazil